Manus O'Donnell (Irish: Maghnas Ó Domhnaill or Manus Ó Domhnaill, died 1564) was an Irish lord and son of Sir Hugh Dubh O'Donnell. He was an important member of the O'Donnell dynasty based in County Donegal in Ulster.

Early life
Hugh Dubh (pronounced in Ulster Irish as 'Hugh Doo') had been Rí (king) of the O'Donnells during one of the bitterest and most protracted of the feuds between his clan and the O'Neills, which in 1491 led to a war lasting more than ten years. He left his son to rule Tyrconnell, though still a boy, when he went on a pilgrimage to Rome about 1511. On his return from Rome (via England, where he was knighted by King Henry VIII) in broken health after two years' absence, his son Manus, who had proved himself a capable leader in defending his country against the O'Neills, retained the chief authority. When Sir Hugh Dubh O'Donnell, as he was now, appealed for aid against his son to the Maguires, Manus made an alliance with the O'Neills, by whose assistance he established his hold over Tyrconnell. But in 1522 the two great northern clans were again at war.

Conn O'Neill, An Ó Néill (who was created The 1st Earl of Tyrone in 1542), was determined to bring the O'Donnells under his rule. Supported by Munster and Connacht, and assisted also by English contingents and by the MacDonnells of Antrim, O'Neill took the castle of Ballyshannon, and after devastating a large part of Tyrconnell he encamped at Knockavoe, near Strabane. Here he was surprised at night by Sir Hugh Dubh and Manus O'Donnell, and routed with the loss of 900 men and an immense quantity of booty in the Battle of Knockavoe. Although this was one of the bloodiest ever battles between the O'Neills and the O'Donnells, it did not end the war; and in 1531 O'Donnell applied to the Lordship of Ireland for protection, giving assurances of allegiance to King Henry VIII.

Geraldine League

In February 1537, The 10th Earl of Kildare (previously known as Lord Offaly, and better known to history as 'Silken Thomas') and his five uncles were executed at Tyburn for their rebellion in Leinster. Following their executions, the English Crown made every effort to capture Gerald, 11th Earl of Kildare, the new head of the FitzGerald dynasty and the new claimant to the Earldom of Kildare, a boy of twelve who was in the secret custody of his aunt, Lady Eleanor McCarthy.

Lady Eleanor, in order to secure a powerful protector for the boy, accepted an offer of marriage from Manus O'Donnell, who on the death of Sir Hugh Dubh in July 1537 was inaugurated as "The O'Donnell". Conn O'Neill (later Earl of Tyrone) was a relative of the young Lord Kildare, and this event accordingly led to the formation of the short-lived Geraldine League, a federation including the O'Neills, the O'Donnells, the O'Briens of Thomond, and other powerful clans; the primary object of which was to restore young Lord Kildare to his lands, titles and properties, but which afterwards aimed at the complete overthrow of English rule in Ireland.

Chief of the O'Donnells
In August 1539, O'Donnell and Conn O'Neill were heavily defeated by the Lord Deputy at Lake Bellahoe, in County Monaghan, which crippled their power for many years. In the west Manus made unceasing efforts to assert the supremacy of the O'Donnells in north Connacht, where he compelled O'Conor Sligo to acknowledge his over-lordship in 1539. In 1542 he went to England and presented himself, together with Conn O'Neill and other Irish chiefs, became a Protestant, and recognising Henry VIII, who promised to make him Earl of Tyrconnell, though he refused O'Donnell's request to be made Earl of Sligo. The assimilation process was known as "surrender and regrant".

In his later years Manus was troubled by quarrels between his sons Hugh and Calvagh MacManus; in 1555 he was imprisoned by Calvagh, who deposed him from all authority in Tyrconnell, and he died in 1564. Manus O'Donnell, though a fierce warrior, was hospitable and generous to the poor and the Church. He is described by the Four Masters as "a learned man, skilled in many arts, gifted with a profound intellect, and the knowledge of every science." At his castle of Portnatrynod near Strabane he supervised, if he did not actually dictate, the writing of the Life of Saint Columbkille in Irish, which is preserved in the Bodleian Library (Rawlinson B 514) at Oxford. He was also a poet and many of his poems, written in Irish, survive.

Family
Manus was married several times. His first wife, Joan O'Reilly, was the mother of Calvagh, and two daughters, both of whom married O'Neills; the younger, Margaret, was wife of the famous rebel Shane O'Neill. His second wife, Hugh's mother, by whom he was ancestor of the Earls of Tyrconnell (see below), was Judith, sister of Conn Bacach O'Neill, 1st earl of Tyrone, and aunt of Shane.

References

Rev. Richard Henebry: The Life of Columcille (ascribed to Magnus O'Donnell). Text from Rawlinson B. 514, with translation. (Zeitschrift für celtische Philologie. III., IV., IX, XI, 1901–1917).
Four Masters, Annals of Ireland by the: Translated and Edited by John O'Donovan. Dublin, 1856.

See also
Cruithnechán

Year of birth missing
1564 deaths
Kings of Tír Chonaill
People from County Donegal
16th-century Irish people
Irish-language writers
Irish writers